Robert Caprioli (born 11 July 1967) is a former Australian rules footballer who played one game for Sydney in the Victorian Football League (VFL) in 1986. He was recruited from the St George AFC in the Sydney Football League. He was selected in the Swans' last home game of 1986 as a late replacement player. He was one of eight players from New South Wales in the Sydney team that day.

References

External links

Living people
1967 births
Sydney Swans players
St George AFC players
Australian rules footballers from New South Wales